The 2015–16 Baltic Men Volleyball League, also known as the League of Hundred, was the 11th edition of the highest level of club volleyball in the Baltic states.

Participating teams

The following teams took part in the 2015–16 edition of Baltic Men Volleyball League.

Venues and personnel

Main Tournament
All participating 13 clubs were playing according to the double round robin system.

|}
Updated to match(es) played on 28 February 2016. Source: League of Hundred 2015/2016 Regular Season

Playoffs
The four winners of each series qualified to the Final Four, while the other four teams were eliminated.

Final four
Organizer: Pärnu
Venue: Pärnu Sports Hall, Pärnu, Estonia

Semifinals

|}

3rd place match

|}

Final

|}

Final ranking

Final four awards

Most Valuable Player
  Hindrek Pulk (Pärnu)
Best Setter
  Martti Keel (Pärnu)
Best Outside Hitters
  Andrus Raadik (Pärnu)
  Ansis Medenis (Poliurs/Ozolnieki)

Best Middle Blockers
  Timo Tammemaa (Pärnu)
  Peteris Aukmanis (Biolars/Jelgava)
Best Opposite Hitter
  Hindrek Pulk (Pärnu)
Best Libero
  Austris Štāls (Biolars/Jelgava)

References

External links
Official website  

Baltic Men Volleyball League
2015 in volleyball
2016 in volleyball
2015 in Estonian sport
2016 in Estonian sport
2015 in Latvian sport
2016 in Latvian sport
2015 in Lithuanian sport
2016 in Lithuanian sport
2015–16 in European volleyball leagues